A by-election was in the Tasmanian Legislative Council seat of Pembroke on 10 September 2022, triggered by the resignation of Jo Siejka, who did so in order to spend more time with her family.

Background 
Jo Siejka, nominated by the Australian Labor Party, was first elected to the seat of Pembroke at a 2017 by-election following the resignation Vanessa Goodwin who had been diagnosed with multiple brain tumours in March of that year, defeating her Liberal opponent by 7.4% in the two-party preferred count. Siejka, who was Leader of the Opposition in the Legislative Council and held the shadow portfolios of disability, ageing and veterans, announced that she would resign before the expiry of her electoral mandate, in order to spend more time with her family.

Candidates

Results

References 

2022 elections in Australia
Tasmania state by-elections